Uluberia Purba Assembly constituency is an assembly constituency in Howrah district in the Indian state of West Bengal.

Overview
As per orders of the Delimitation Commission, the newly constituted No. 176 Uluberia Purba Assembly constituency  is composed of the following: Uluberia municipality, and Khalisani and Raghudevpur gram panchayats of Uluberia II community development block.

Uluberia Purba Assembly constituency is part of No. 26 Uluberia (Lok Sabha constituency).

Members of Legislative Assembly

Election results

2019 by-election

2016

2011

 

.# Swing calculated on Congress+Trinamool Congress vote percentages taken together, as well as the CPI(M) vote percentage, for the now-defunct Kalyanpur Assembly constituency in 2006.

References

Assembly constituencies of West Bengal
Politics of Howrah district
2011 establishments in West Bengal
Constituencies established in 2011